The term Nawab of Pataudi refers to the lineage of rulers of the former princely Pataudi State in Northern India. Pataudi was established in 1804 by the British East India Company, when Faiz Talab Khan, an Afghan Muslim Pashtun of the Barech tribe, who was made the first Nawab, aided them in their battle against the Maratha Empire, during the Second Anglo-Maratha War. The family traces their origin to 16th century India, when their ancestors immigrated from present day Afghanistan to India during the period of the Lodi dynasty.
 
The 8th Nawab of Pataudi, Iftikhar Ali Khan Pataudi, played first-class cricket for both England and India while his son, Mansoor Ali Khan Pataudi, the last Nawab, captained the Indian cricket team.

Actor Saif Ali Khan and actress Soha Ali Khan are the children of the last Nawab of Pataudi, whereas actress Sara Ali Khan is the granddaughter of the last Nawab.

Rulers
All rulers bore the title of Nawab.

Muhammad Faiz Ali Talab Khan Siddiqui (reigned 1804–1829)
Muhammad Akbar Ali Khan Siddiqui (r. 1829–1862)
Muhammad Taqi Ali Khan Siddiqui (r. 1862–1867)
Muhammad Mokhtar Ali Khan Siddiqui (r. 1867–1878)
Muhammad Momtaz Ali Khan Siddiqui (r. 1878–1898)
Mohammad Mozaffar Ali Khan Siddiqui (r. 1898–1913)
Mohammad Ibrahim Ali Khan Siddiqui (r. 1913–1917)
Iftikhar Ali Khan Pataudi (r. 1917–1947), titular ruler (1947–1952)
Mansoor Ali Khan Pataudi titular ruler (1952–1971; title abolished in 1971)

References

Nawabs of India
History of Haryana
Gurgaon district
Pataudi